Events in the year 1933 in Bulgaria.

Incumbents 
Monarch – Boris III
Nicola Mushanov Chairman of the Council of Ministers

Events 

 February 27 – Following the burning of Germany's parliament building, Bulgarian Communist Georgi Dimitrov is accused of co-conspiring in what the Nazi's claimed was arson. He was later acquitted.

References 

 
1930s in Bulgaria
Years of the 20th century in Bulgaria
Bulgaria
Bulgaria